The 2002 FIA GT Jarama 500 km was the fourth round the 2002 FIA GT Championship season. It took place at the Circuito Permanente Del Jarama, Spain, on 2 June 2002.

Official results
Class winners in bold.  Cars failing to complete 70% of winner's distance marked as Not Classified (NC).

Statistics
 Pole position – #23 BMS Scuderia Italia – 1:31.000
 Fastest lap – #23 BMS Scuderia Italia – 1:32.404
 Average speed – 143.010 km/h

References

 
 
 

J
FIA GT